Marina Kolomiets is a former Russian football defender. Throughout her career she played for several teams in the Russian Championship, winning seven leagues with CSK VVS Samara, Energiya Voronezh, Lada Togliatti and Zvezda Perm.

She was a member of the Russian national team, and took part in the 2003 World Cup.

Titles
 7 Russian Championships (1993, 1994, 1997, 1998, 2004, 2007, 2008)
 9 Russian Cups (1994, 1996, 1997, 1999, 2000, 2002, 2003, 2004, 2007)

References

1972 births
Living people
Soviet women's footballers
Kazakhstani women's footballers
Russian women's footballers
Russia women's international footballers
2003 FIFA Women's World Cup players
CSK VVS Samara (women's football club) players
FC Energy Voronezh players
Ryazan-VDV players
FC Lada Togliatti (women) players
Zvezda 2005 Perm players
Women's association football defenders
Russian Women's Football Championship players